Kappa Columbae, Latinized from κ Columbae, is a solitary star in the southern constellation of Columba. It has an apparent visual magnitude of 4.37, which is bright enough to be seen with the naked eye. Based upon an annual parallax shift of 17.87 mas, it is located at a distance of 183 light years from the Sun.

This is an evolved K-type giant star with a stellar classification of K0.5 IIIa. At the estimated distance of this star, this yields a physical size of about 10.5 times the radius of the Sun. It has an estimated 1.76 times the mass of the Sun and is about 1.7 billion years old. The star radiates 57.5 times the solar luminosity from its outer atmosphere at an effective temperature of 4,876 K. It is catalogued as a suspected variable star.

References

K-type giants
Columba (constellation)
Columbae, Kappa
Durchmusterung objects
043785
029807
02256